R P Marutharajaa (born 1963) is an Indian politician and Member of Parliament elected from Tamil Nadu. He is elected to the Lok Sabha from Perambalur constituency. He contested as an Anna Dravida Munnetra Kazhagam candidate in 2014 election. He had served as chairman of Perambalur union between 2011 and 2014.

References 

All India Anna Dravida Munnetra Kazhagam politicians
Living people
India MPs 2014–2019
Lok Sabha members from Tamil Nadu
1963 births
People from Perambalur district
National College, Tiruchirappalli alumni